King Chang of Goryeo (6 September 1380 – 31 December 1389) was the 33rd and youngest ruler of the Goryeo Dynasty of Korea. His life and death is often compared with Grand Prince Yeongchang.

Biography

Prince Chang was the only son of King U and Royal Consort Geun of the Goseong Yi clan, daughter of Yi Rim. King U was forced from power after Yi Seong-gye mutinied in 1388, and King Chang was put on the throne in his stead.

During his reign from June 1388 to November 1389, Chang experienced a great chaos of reforms. There were two factions: one wanted a conservational reform, and the other wanted a radical reform. The former was led by Cho Min-soo, and Yi Saek, and the latter was led by Yi Seong-gye, and Jeong Do-jeon. King Chang tried to arbitrate the two fractions. However, as Yi Saek lost his political power following the impeachment of Yi Sung-yin, King Chang lost his authority, bringing Yi Seong-gye to the greatest power.

In November 1389, there was a rumor that former King U tried to assassinate Yi Seong-gye. This provided the reason for abdication of King Chang.

King Chang was assassinated, together with his father, shortly after the ascension of Gongyang, whilst in exile. King Chang was 9 years of age.

Family
Parents
Father: King U of Goryeo (고려우)(25 July 1365 – 31 December 1389) 
Grandfather: King Gongmin of Goryeo (고려 공민왕)(23 May 1330 – 27 October 1374)
Grandmother: Banya (반야)
Mother: Royal Consort Geun of the Goseong Yi clan (근비 이씨)
Grandfather: Yi Rim (이림; d. 1391)
Grandmother: Lady Hong of Byeonhan State (변한국부인 홍씨)

In popular culture
 Portrayed by Kim A-reum in the 1983 KBS1 TV series Foundation of the Kingdom.
 Portrayed by Jeon Hyeon in the 1983 MBC TV series The King of Chudong Palace.
Portrayed by Yun Dong-won in the 1996–1998 KBS TV series Tears of the Dragon.
 Portrayed by Kim Jun-seong in the 2014 KBS TV series Jeong Do-jeon.
Portrayed by Hwang Jae-won in the 2015–2016 SBS TV series Six Flying Dragons.

See also
List of monarchs of Korea
Goryeo

References

External links
 

1380 births
1389 deaths
Child monarchs from Asia
Monarchs deposed as children
14th-century Korean monarchs
Korean Buddhist monarchs
People from Kaesong
Monarchs who died as children